PC Party may refer to:

 Progressive Conservative Party of Canada, a former federal party which merged into the Conservative Party of Canada in 2003
 Progressive Conservative Party (disambiguation), various other Canadian political parties
 Progressive Canadian Party, a minor party formed 2004 after the dissolution of the Progressive Conservative Party of Canada